Star Track can refer to the following:

StarTrack, an Australian delivery company
Star Track (album), by Leo Ku
 "Star Track" (song), a song by Jefferson Airplane on the album Crown of Creation
 "Star Track", a parody of the "Star Trek" universe in Kevin Lyons' Takeoffs Equals Landings comic series.

See also
Star Trek, a popular science fiction franchise that is often mispronounced as Star Track
Star Trak Entertainment, a record label also known as Star Trak
Star tracker, an optical device
Star trail, a photographic genre